Ranni or Ranny is a town in the Pathanamthitta district of Kerala, India, and the 16th largest taluk (administrative division) in Kerala, located on both sides of the Pamba River. It Is located 30 km from Tiruvalla railway station & NH 183 in Tiruvalla.

Etymology 

The name Ranni is derived from a word in Malayalam which means "Queen", or Rani. The town is known as "The Queen of the Eastern Hill Lands" (മലനാടിന്റെ റാണി).

History 

The history of Ranni can be traced back 5000 years to the early settlement of Adi Dravidans around Sabarimala and Nilakkal. The temple at Sabarimala dates back 2000 years. The deity's sitting posture and resemblance of the prayer 'Sharanam vili' to "Buddham Sharanam / Sangam Sharanam" points to the area's Buddhist past. The word 'Ayya' is a Buddhist Pali word that means Lord/God. An ancient trade route used to pass through Nilackal between Kerala and the Pandian kingdom.

The former rulers of Ranni were known as the Ranni Karthas or the Karthkal of Ranni, the "Samanthas" and blood-related family of Thekkamamkoor Raja. In the 18th century, Anizham Thirunal Marthandavarma of Vennad annexed the Thekkamkoor kingdom and confiscated all the lands that belonged to the former rulers.

Ranni Karthas Kioyikal (the Ranni Karth palace) was located in Areekkal. The Ranni Karthas also built Ranni Manjor Ramapuram temple. The temple is the same architecturally as the Aranmula Sreeparthasaradhy temple but the darshan of the former faces south.

In the 18th century, Knanaya Christians migrated to Ranni from Kallissery and established the St. Thomas Church of Ranni. A significant number of Malankara Orthodox Christians and Mar Thomites also migrated from surrounding areas. In the early 19th century, Dr. Claudius Buchanan visited Ranni and was presented with an old handwritten Syriac Bible from Ranni St. Thomas Church.

Ranni was a part of the Central Travancore region before the unification of India. Until the formation of Pathanamthitta district in 1982, Ranni was a part of the Kollam district.

Geography 

It has an average elevation of 131 m (433 ft) above sea level. However, towards the east, the elevation is much higher. The river Pamba flows through Ranni township. Out of the total area,  or 70% are forest.

Climate 

Like the rest of Kerala, Ranni has a wet and maritime tropical climate. With river Pamba overflowing, Ranni is always under a threat of floods during Monsoons. Although the summer is from March to May, the area receives locally developed thundershowers in May. Due to the higher elevation, the climate is cooler in the east.

Demographics 

 Ranni taluk had a census population of 198,194, of which 94,773 were males and 103,421 were females. The female-to-male ratio is 1091:1000, higher than the state average and significantly higher than the national average. There were 53,172 households within the taluk's limits. A very low housing density is owed to a large reserved forest area. Ranni's literacy rate is 95%.

Although most of the residents are Malayalis there are some Tamil, Sikh, Bihari, and Bengali settlers. Much of the population are temporary workers who are employed in the construction sector. The population of migrant workers from the northern parts of India has increased over the last few years because of the shortage of local unskilled manpower. A few settlements of aborigines known as 'adivasis' are deep in the forest area.

Ranni's major religions are Hinduism and Christianity.

Administration 

Ranni taluk is administered under Pathanamthitta district. The taluk headquarters is at Block pady. Ranni taluk is divided into 11 villages:

Economy 

Commerce in Ranni is centered around a market in the main township, Ittiyappara, which is situated on the northern side of the river. The economy of Ranni is primarily based on agriculture. The hilly terrain, high humidity and good rain makes it suitable for rubber cultivation, and Ranni is one of the largest rubber-producing taluks in Kerala. Other major crops are cocoa, coconut, tapioca and black pepper. Ranni taluk has the largest Non-resident Indian (NRI) population in the state of Kerala, which is another major source of income.

Transport

Ranni is largely dependent on private buses and most long-route Kerala State Road Transport Corporation (KSRTC) buses use State Highway 08. There is a KSRTC bus depot in Ranni adjacent to the private bus stand.  Auto rickshaws are also available and are generally hired for short distances (1–3 km) where bus services are lacking. Jeeps are another preferred mode of transport where the terrain is hilly or rugged.

A train service connecting Ranni to industrial centers is a long-standing demand of citizens. Although the Union Government cleared a railway proposal in 1995, the project awaits implementation.

Education 

Primary, middle, and secondary schools are available in all the villages of Ranni taluk. However, there are only seven senior secondary schools covering six of the eleven villages. This is primarily because prior to 1997–98, secondary education was offered as pre-degree courses in colleges. As of 2001, there are 138 primary, 59 middle and 35 secondary schools.

There are three colleges in Ranni taluk. St. Thomas college, Ranni, an arts and science college established in 1964, is affiliated with Mahatma Gandhi University. For almost four decades this was the only college in the taluk. In 2005, Caarmel Engineering College, a self-financing engineering college, was established in the Ranni-Perunad division, but closed due to financial crisis. The Vishwa Bhramana Arts College and Government Polytechnic College are situated in Vechuchira. The Mar Thoma Teachers’ Training College Ranni is a self-financing institution affiliated with MG University and approved by NCTE.

Ranni also has three adult literacy centers. Ranni is a hub of central board schools with St. Mary's School, Ranni, an institution active for over 40 years. Cornerstone International School (including Cornerstone Kidscenter) and Citadel are other secondary options among CBSE schools. These literacy centers or "Saksharatha Kendram" came as a state effort to attain 100% adult literacy.

Politics 

The Ranni assembly constituency is part of Pathanamthitta (Lok Sabha constituency). The main political parties are the Indian National Congress (INC), Communist Party of India (Marxist) (CPM), Communist Party of India (CPI), and Kerala Congress. The BJP (Bharatiya Janatha Party), now AAP (Aam Aadmi Party), has significant influence in the election. Pramod Narayan is the elected representative of Ranni assembly constituency. He successfully contested assembly election in 2021.

Media 

There are three local television channels in Ranni. Citi TV The channel, established in 2002, telecasts news, documentaries, advertisements, albums and other programs. Malanad TV operates from Pazhavangadi. Vismaya TV, established 2014, is the largest local channel in Pathanamthitta district.

Culture

The Devi Temple Thottamon Kavu is another landmark of Ranni. It is a resting place for pilgrims to Sabarimala and belongs to a few nair families in Ranni.  The family that administrate the temple is known as naaluveedanmaar (നാലുവീടന്മാർ), or "the four nobles". The four Panikar families who hold the title are the Meempallil (മീമ്പള്ളിൽ), Kerukattu (Padiyarakkalayil, കേറുകാട്ട്), Pangattu (പങ്ങാട്ട്) and Cheruthalayathu (ചെറുതാലയത്ത്).

See also 
 Angadi
 Angamoozhy
 Kalampala
 Keekozhur
 Pathanamthitta district
 Perunad
 Sabarimala
 Thottamon
 Kozhencherry
 Aranmula

References

External links 

 The Complete Ranni News
 A Detailed history of Ranni
 Thottamon-Ranni

Cities and towns in Pathanamthitta district